Born Naked is the seventh  studio album from American singer-songwriter, actor and drag queen RuPaul. It was released on iTunes and Amazon through RuCo on February 24, 2014, coinciding with the sixth season premiere of RuPaul's Drag Race. The album is RuPaul's highest charting to date, reaching 4th position on US Billboard's Dance/Electronic Albums list. The album is a mix of electronic, bounce, rock and gospel tunes.

Chart performance

Born Naked debuted at number 85 on the Billboard 200, selling 4,000 copies for the week ending March 2, 2014. It is RuPaul's highest charting album to date, as well as his first entry on the chart since his debut album, Supermodel of the World, peaked at number 109 in 1993. The album also debuted at number four on the Billboard Dance/Electronic Albums chart, another career high, and at number 18 on the Billboard Independent Albums chart, RuPaul's first appearance on the chart. Notably, Born Naked also reached number one on the iTunes Top Dance Albums chart in the US, also charting at number 23 on the store's Top albums chart.

Track listing
Credits adapted from ASCAP and SESAC.

Samples
"Sissy That Walk" contains elements of "Pound the Alarm" by Nicki Minaj.

Notes
 signifies remix engineer and additional producer
 signifies original producer in addition to remix engineer and additional producer

Charts

Release history

References

2014 albums
RuPaul albums
Albums produced by Lucian Piane